The Running of the Interns is a Washington, DC, tradition, sometimes called a race, that involves interns of news outlets running to deliver results of major decisions by the Supreme Court of the United States to the press. Many media outlets have made note of this, including BuzzFeed, Newsweek, NPR and Cosmopolitan.

History
Since 1946, recording devices have been banned inside the courtroom of the United States Supreme Court Building. Thus, hand-delivered, paper copies remain the fastest way for news organizations to receive a particular landmark ruling.

The Supreme Court's decision is printed and delivered to a clerk's office, where it is handed to members of the press. Interns are not credentialed and must therefore wait in the hallway outside the press room. Producers hand the paper copy rulings to their network interns, who sprint to deliver them to their respective organizations. Supporters and protestors alike cheer on the delivery of the opinions. According to one intern, justices may still be announcing the decision by the time they are back inside.

The interns often run wearing sneakers and business casual suits or skirts in  heat. 

In 2015, the interns were briefly removed after a CNN intern was caught by Supreme Court Police recording video footage with a GoPro camera.

In 2016, interns relayed 13 decisions over three mornings.

Notable decision coverage
 Whole Woman's Health v. Hellerstedt
 King v. Burwell
 Obergefell v. Hodges
McDonnell v. United States

References

External links
 Buzzfeed News: The 2014 Running Of The Interns, June 30, 2014
 Wired.com: Why Supreme Court Interns Still Sprint to Deliver News, June 25, 2015
 CBS News, The 2016 Running of the Interns,  June 27, 2016
 Youtube, Running of the Interns, June 26, 2013
 Minnesota Public Radio, The running of the Interns, August 22, 2018
 Youtube, The Five Running of the Interns, Aug 22, 2018
 ABC News, 'Start Here': Running of the interns, June 27, 2018
 Good Morning America, The 'GMA' Gang Performs the 'Running of the Interns', July 1, 2014
 ABC News: Watch Interns Make A Run For It At The Supreme Court, June 26, 2015

Supreme Court of the United States
Mass media in Washington, D.C.
Culture of Washington, D.C.